The Orpheum Theater is an old movie house in Flagstaff, Arizona, originally named the Majestic Opera House.  The building was constructed in 1911. It was rebuilt and expanded in 1917, and renamed the Orpheum. The theater closed in 1999. Three years later, in 2002, it reopened as a concert venue. It is owned by Chris Scully and Charles Smith.

References

External links 
 Official website
 Orpheum Theater at Cinema Treasures

Music venues in Arizona
Cinemas and movie theaters in Arizona
Buildings and structures in Flagstaff, Arizona
Music venues completed in 2002
2002 establishments in Arizona
Theatres completed in 1911
Opera houses in Arizona
1911 establishments in Arizona Territory
Tourist attractions in Flagstaff, Arizona